Flow Rider may refer to:

Flo Rida, an American rapper
A participant in the water sport of flowriding
A water ride developed by Wave Loch for flowriding